DD Odia is a state owned TV channel telecasting from Doordarshan Kendra Cuttack.

History
DD Odia is a satellite channel broadcasting in Odia, launched in 1994. DD Odia broadcasts serials, cultural programmes, infotainment programmes, news and current affairs etc. Most of its programmes are produced at Doordarshan Kendras of Bhubaneshwar, Sambalpur and Bhawanipatna. While the weekly transmission hours for the terrestrial channel with satellite support is 37 hours and 30 min, for the satellite (DD-6-Odia) it is 168 hours. DD-6 programmes are mostly related to Odia films, folk dance, music, and other cultural programmes only besides regional news. DD Odia grabs about 29% of the Total Market share in India. It reaches to almost 23% of the total population in India.

Programs
 Hello Doctor – a live phone-in health show hosted by Manoj Tripathy, Dr. Deepak or Rudra Pradhan

See also
List of Odia-language television channels
List of longest-running Indian television series
Ministry of Information and Broadcasting
List of television stations in India
All India Radio

References

External links
 Doordarshan Official Internet site
 Odia Doordarshan Facebook page

Television channels and stations established in 1994
Odia-language television channels
Doordarshan
Companies based in Bhubaneswar
Foreign television channels broadcasting in the United Kingdom
1994 establishments in Orissa
Direct broadcast satellite services
Indian direct broadcast satellite services
Television stations in Bhubaneswar